Ny Troor Tromode ( or Yn Troor) was a Manx nationalist group charged with 17 counts of crimes including arson and criminal damage.

See also
Fo Halloo, another Manx militant organisation
Irree Magh
FSFO

References

Manx nationalism
Separatism in the Isle of Man
Paramilitary organisations based in the United Kingdom
Manx words and phrases